Seimare Dam, also known as Hini Mini or spelled Seymareh, is an arch dam on the Seimare River in Badreh County, Ilam Province, Iran. The primary purpose of the dam is hydroelectric power generation. Studies for the dam were carried out in the mid to late 1970s and construction began on the diversion works in 1997. In 2006, concrete placement began and on 19 May 2011, the dam began to impound the river. The dam's first generator became operational in 2013. The power plant, located downstream, houses three 160 MW Francis turbine-generators with an installed capacity of 480 MW.

. The dam sits at the head of a  catchment area and creates a reservoir with a  capacity. The dam has a main and auxiliary spillway.

See also

List of power stations in Iran

References

Dams in Ilam Province
Dams completed in 2013
Hydroelectric power stations in Iran
Arch dams
Buildings and structures in Ilam Province
2013 establishments in Iran